Dileep Singh Bhuria (1944 – 24 June 2015) was a member of Lok Sabha of India. He was elected to Lok Sabha from Ratlam (Lok Sabha constituency) in Madhya Pradesh as member of Congress from 1980 to 1998. Later he joined Bharatiya Janata Party and won Ratlam seat as its candidate in 2014.
 
He died in Gurgaon on 24 June 2015 after suffering a second myocardial infarction.

References

People from Jhabua
India MPs 1980–1984
India MPs 1984–1989
India MPs 1989–1991
India MPs 1991–1996
India MPs 1996–1997
Lok Sabha members from Madhya Pradesh
India MPs 2014–2019
1944 births
People from Ratlam
2015 deaths
Bharatiya Janata Party politicians from Madhya Pradesh
Indian National Congress politicians from Madhya Pradesh